Hypolimnas alimena, the blue-banded eggfly, is a species of butterfly in the family Nymphalidae. It is found in the Solomon Islands, Indonesia (Aru Islands, Irian Jaya, Kei Islands, Maluku), New Guinea and Australia (the coast of New South Wales, the Northern Territory and Queensland).

Wingspan: 80–90 mm. The ground colour of the wings is black with a row of white dots and a blue band.

The larvae feed on Pseuderanthemum variabile, Asystasia gangetica and Graptophyllum pictum.

Subspecies
Hypolimnas alimena afra Fruhstorfer, 1903 (Trobriand Islands)
Hypolimnas alimena alimena (Ambon, Serang, Saparua)
Hypolimnas alimena bandana Fruhstorfer, 1912 (Banda Island)
Hypolimnas alimena bateia Fruhstorfer, 1915 (Yule Island, Yela Island)
Hypolimnas alimena curicta Fruhstorfer, 1912 (Noemfoor Island)
Hypolimnas alimena darwinensis Waterhouse & Lyell, 1914 (Northern Territory)
Hypolimnas alimena diffusa Howarth, 1962 (Bellona Island)
Hypolimnas alimena eligia Fruhstorfer, 1912 (Bachan, Halmahera, Morotai, Ternate)
Hypolimnas alimena eremita Butler, 1883 (West Irian to eastern New Guinea)
Hypolimnas alimena forbesi Butler, 1883 (Timor to Tanimbar)
Hypolimnas alimena fuliginescens (Mathew, 1887) (Ugi Island)
Hypolimnas alimena heteromorpha Röber, 1891 (Kai Island)
Hypolimnas alimena inexpectata Godman & Salvin, 1877 (Bismarck Archipelago)
Hypolimnas alimena lamina Fruhstorfer, 1903 (Torres Strait Islands, Cape York to Gympi)
Hypolimnas alimena libateia Howarth, 1962 (Rennell Island)
Hypolimnas alimena libisonia Fruhstorfer, 1912 (Papua New Guinea)
Hypolimnas alimena manusi Rothschild, 1915 (Admiralty Islands)
Hypolimnas alimena obsolescens Fruhstorfer, 1903 (Fergusson Island)
Hypolimnas alimena polymena (C. & R. Felder, [1867]) (Aru)
Hypolimnas alimena remigia Fruhstorfer, 1912 (Obi)
Hypolimnas alimena salomonis Ribbe, 1897 (Bougainville, Shortland Islands, New Georgia Group)
Hypolimnas alimena saturnia Fruhstorfer, 1903 (Waigeu)
Hypolimnas alimena senia Fruhstorfer, 1912 (Buru)
Hypolimnas alimena ysabela Fruhstorfer, 1912 (Santa Isabel)

References

alimena
Butterflies of Oceania
Butterflies of Australia
Butterflies of Indonesia
Insects of the Solomon Islands
Insects of Western New Guinea
Lepidoptera of New Guinea
Lepidoptera of Papua New Guinea
Butterflies described in 1758
Taxa named by Carl Linnaeus